Lucius Hostilius Mancinus was a Roman magistrate, general, and consul of Rome during 145 BC. He is claimed to be the ancestor of the Mancini family, one of the oldest families of Roman nobility.

He was probably the son of Aulus Hostilius Mancinus, the consul in 170 BC together with Aulus Atilius Serranus. He served as the Legatus of the consul Lucius Calpurnius Piso in 148 BC where he commanded the Roman fleet against Carthage in the Third Punic War whilst Piso commanded the land troops. During this war, he commanded the fleet at the Battle of the Port of Carthage and had the privilege of being one of the first to enter the conquered city after it was taken by Publius Cornelius Scipio Aemilianus Africanus Numantinus in 146 BC.

After his return to Rome, he commissioned many art works depicting the war against Carthage and frequently recounted his war stories to the public. As a result, he became very popular with the Roman people and was elected as consul in 145 BC together with Quintus Fabius Maximus Aemilianus.

See also 
 Third Punic War
 Battle of the Port of Carthage
 List of Roman consuls

References 

2nd-century BC Roman consuls
Third Punic War
Ancient Roman generals
Mancinus, Lucius